WGMT (97.7 FM) is a radio station broadcasting a hot adult contemporary format. Licensed to Lyndon, Vermont, United States, the station is owned by Vermont Broadcast Associates, Inc. It airs the live syndicated Liveline with Mason Kelter every weeknight.

References

External links

GMT
Hot adult contemporary radio stations in the United States
Radio stations established in 1990
1990 establishments in Vermont